The 2019-20 Boston University Terriers Men's ice hockey season was the 92nd season of play for the program and the 36th season in the Hockey East conference. The Terriers represented Boston University and were coached by Albie O'Connell, in his 2nd season.

The Hockey East tournament as well as the NCAA Tournament were cancelled due to the COVID-19 pandemic before any games were played.

Roster
As of December 7, 2019.

|}

Standings

Schedule and Results

|-
!colspan=12 style=";" | Regular Season

|- 
!colspan=12 style=";" | 

|- 
!colspan=12 style=";" | 
|- align="center" bgcolor="#e0e0e0"
|colspan=12|Tournament Cancelled

Scoring Statistics

Goaltending statistics

Rankings

Players drafted into the NHL

2020 NHL Entry Draft

† incoming freshman

References

2019-20
Boston University Terriers 
Boston University Terriers 
2019 in sports in Massachusetts
2020 in sports in Massachusetts